Trematocranus labifer is a species of cichlid endemic to Lake Malawi where it prefers the shallows off of sandy beaches.  This species can reach a length of  TL.  This species can also be found in the aquarium trade.

References

labifer
Taxa named by Ethelwynn Trewavas
Fish described in 1935
Taxonomy articles created by Polbot